Øvre Romerike District Court (Norwegian: Øvre Romerike tingrett) is a district court located in Eidsvoll, Norway.  The Court covers the area around Oslo Airport, the municipalities of Eidsvoll, Ullensaker, Nannestad, Hurdal and Nes and is subordinate to the Eidsivating Court of Appeal.

References

External links 
 Official site 

Defunct district courts of Norway
Organisations based in Eidsvoll